Several ships of the French navy have borne the name Amarante:
Amarante (1708), 14 guns, design by Philippe Cochois, launched 29 March 1708 at Le Havre - deleted 1724.
Amarante (1747), corvette wrecked 1760.
Wrecked in 1799.
  (1915),  an  launched in 1915 and struck in 1925.

French Navy ship names